Michael V. Nelson (born June 2, 1954) is an American politician and member of the Minnesota House of Representatives. A member of the Minnesota Democratic–Farmer–Labor Party (DFL), he represents District 38A, which includes the cities of Brooklyn Park and Osseo in Hennepin County in the Twin Cities metropolitan area. He is a carpenter by profession.

Early life, education, and career
Nelson was born in Minneapolis and attended Park Center High School. He attended Hennepin Technical College in Brooklyn Park for Carpentry in 1974. He served for 16 years as a member of the Minneapolis Housing Authority.

Minnesota House of Representatives
In 2002, the death of Representative Darlene Luther triggered a special election, in which Nelson lost to Republican John Jordan. Nelson challenged Jordan again in the 2002 general election and won. 

Nelson was first elected in 2002 and has been re-elected every two years since then for a total of 11 terms in the legislature. Nelson represents one of the most diverse districts in the State with a constituency over 60% People of Color.

During the 2007-2008 legislative session, Nelson served as an Assistant Majority Leader for the DFL. From 2009-2010, he served as chair of the Local Government Division, and from 2013-2014 he was chair of the Government Operations Committee. When Democrats retook control of the House in 2018, Nelson was chosen to chair the State Government Finance and Elections Committee. In 2023 Nelson, a carpenter by trade, became chair of the Labor and Industry Finance and Policy Committee.

References

External links

 Rep. Nelson Web Page
 Minnesota Public Radio Votetracker: Rep. Michael Nelson
 Project Votesmart - Rep. Michael Nelson Profile

1954 births
Living people
People from Brooklyn Park, Minnesota
Democratic Party members of the Minnesota House of Representatives
American Lutherans
21st-century American politicians